Star Rangers was a four-issue American science-fiction comic-book series created by writer Mark Ellis and artist Jim Mooney, following the adventures of a military spaceship crew in a 25th-century controlled by corporations.

Publication history
Star Rangers, released by the independent comics company Adventure Publications, ran four issue cover-dated October 1987 to February 1988. It was created by writer Mark Ellis and artist Jim Mooney. Scott Behnke edited the series, for which Dave Dorman provided cover art. Mooney was a longtime industry veteran of The Amazing Spider-Man and other series who had recently ended a contract with Marvel Comics to enter semi-retirement.

In a 2007 interview, Ellis recalled that

Story
Set in the 25th century, the series revolved around the crew of the Sabre, the last ship in the Frontier Battalion of the once-fearsome Star Rangers Corps. In both Star Rangers and its companion series Death Hawk, the era is a dystopia of Solar System-spanning corporations that held the true power behind the centralized government of the Sol 9 Commonwealth. By the time of the series, the Star Rangers Corps has been reorganized into a token peacekeeping force while the corporations maintain their own security divisions, such as the Sol 9 Shogunate's Tigers of Heaven. As such, all Star Rangers ships and weaponry are outdated, making it difficult for Sabre crew to perform its duties. The ship patrols Sectors Four through Nine of the Orion Arm.

The  crew consists of:
 Commander Jon Blake
Aristo the reptilian medic
 Ahrikeem, master of combat from the Vholon Empire
 Radac, the ship's synthetic human engineer
Maya Lucas, an embittered pilot who has little use for men.
They report to Commodore Nyota M'membe.

The story arc of the four-issue series dealt with the Rangers uncovering a conspiracy between two corporations and the criminal empire of Lord Rogue on the Freeworld of Amicus, and finding themselves branded criminals by their own organization.

The character Death Hawk appeared as a back-up feature by writer Ellis and penciler Adam Hughes in issues #2-3.

Plans were made for a second Star Rangers series and a crossover with Death Hawk, but Adventure Publications dissolved in the interim.

References

External links
 MarkEllisInk.com
 Deathhawk.com

American comics titles
Science fiction comics
Space Western comics
Fiction set in the 25th century